Güner Ureya (born 6 January 1973 in Prizren, SFR Yugoslavia, today Kosovo) is a Kosovar diplomat. He is the first Kosovar Turkish diplomat to the Republic of Kosovo and first Ambassador of the Republic of Kosovo to the People's Republic of Bangladesh.

Biography

Early life and education
After completing primary and secondary education at home, Ureya graduated from Journalism in the University of Ankara, and subsequently obtained his master's degree on International Relations in Gazi University, both in Turkey.

Career
Güner Ureya has a varied career having worked as a journalist, advisor and having held managerial functions in media and government institutions in Turkey and in Kosovo. His previous posts have seen him engaged in issues such as foreign policy, inter-ethnic relations, organizational and legislation issues.

In September 2008 he has been appointed Deputy Head of Mission to the Embassy of the Republic of Kosovo in Turkey. On August 28, 2019, Ambassador Ureya has presented his letters of credence by which he started his term as Extraordinary and Plenipotentiary Ambassador of the Republic of Kosovo to the People's Republic of Bangladesh.

Notes

References

1973 births
Living people
Ambassadors of Kosovo to Turkey
People from Prizren
Kosovan diplomats
Kosovan Turks
Yugoslav emigrants to Turkey
Yugoslav people of Turkish descent
Kosovan people of Turkish descent